Glenn F. Walther (August 15, 1908 – March 28, 1997) was an American politician. He was a member of the Arkansas House of Representatives, serving from 1947 to 1966. He was a member of the Democratic party.

References

1997 deaths
1908 births
Politicians from Little Rock, Arkansas
20th-century American politicians
Speakers of the Arkansas House of Representatives
Democratic Party members of the Arkansas House of Representatives